Eric "Red Mouth" Gebhardt is an American singer-songwriter, from Alabama (born in Vernon, Texas) who plays a blend of southern music that blends punk, post punk, proto punk, blues, broken-hearted honky tonk, Stonesy rock and roll, with gospel music. Blues in London described his sound as: "a joyfully chaotic reworking of the common sources... identifiably adhering to bluesey, country, folky, forms but happy to accept (actively embrace) a loose interpretation of the detail... a great blend of sasparilla Americana styles pulled together without meandering to 'authenticity', and played with a wit and verve that honour it's antecedents whilst managing a contemporary freshness."

Gebhardt started in a band dubbed The Throwaways who still perform occasionally around the north Alabama area. The band's most notable achievement was a one-off release with High Society Records, an independent record label in Hamburg, Germany. The record did well in Europe, where the band never toured to support the release. The label folded shortly after.

Following the disappointment, Gebhardt moved to Orlando, Florida and formed The Studdogs with Dickie Evans and Jeremy Talcott. Gebhardt stayed with the group for five years, releasing three compact discs. The band was signed by Orange Recordings in Los Angeles and toured all over the country, sharing bills with the Demolition Doll Rods, the Porch Ghouls, Bob Log III, and the Immortal Lee County Killers. His songwriting, however, started to outgrow the sleazy blues rock of the Studdogs, and Gebhardt left the band to pursue a solo career.

This growing interest in songwriting brought Gebhardt back to Florence, and later Biloxi, Mississippi, where his Delta blues-influenced solo acoustic performances (and blazing red beard) earned him the bluesman nickname "Red Mouth."

In 2005, Red Mouth released his solo debut Blues $1.49/lb which scored critical favor in the underground American circuits and the United Kingdom. Blues in London loved the album so much that they appointed Gebhardt as their own personal "man in the States." He regularly writes articles on underground American blues artists, documenting the rigors of life on the road, and occasionally reviews records.

Joe Mauceri of the Dictator Monthly described him as "the bastard rebel child of Lou Reed."

In 2010, Redmouth performed in Lausanne, Switzerland at the 1st Annual Blues Rules Festival. This was a two-day concert featuring acts from around Europe and the United States.

References

External links
Red Mouth's official site
The Studdogs @ Orange Recordings
Blues In London's official site
Wbrianmartin.com

Year of birth missing (living people)
Living people
Musicians from Florence, Alabama
American rock singers
American country singer-songwriters
American blues guitarists
American male guitarists
American blues singer-songwriters
American folk musicians
Guitarists from Alabama
Country musicians from Alabama
American male singer-songwriters
Singer-songwriters from Alabama